Leila Kong (born 5 December 1981) known professionally as  Leila Tong / Tong Ning  is a Hong Kong actress. She was born into an Indonesian Cantonese family. Her birth name is used in her works during her childhood and adolescence.

Career 
At the age of 8, Kong made her first film appearance in director John Woo's action-comedy Once A Thief, which was nominated for several categories at the 11th Annual Hong Kong Film Awards. TVB then recruited Kong as a child star, and she has since then appeared in dramas such as The Greed of Man and State of Divinity.

As an adult, she took a three-year break from the entertainment circle to attend a designing college. Kong has declined TVB's offer to personally manage her.

Before 2004, her popular works include the popular Aqua Heroes and Square Pegs, which also starred Roger Kwok and Jessica Hsuen.

In 2004, she was invited to film CCTV's Liao Zhai along with a host of mainland China's rising stars. The show was extremely popular and spun Liao Zhai II. She also filmed Twin of Brothers, alongside Raymond Lam, Ron Ng, Tavia Yeung and Li Qian of CCTV. Later that year, she starred in The Last Breakthrough, starring Nick Cheung, Raymond Lam and Sonija Kwok. Although The Last Breakthrough did not receive good ratings in HK, it is still remembered and favoured by many as one of the most meaningful and touching series TVB ever made.

The modern sequel to Square Pegs, Life Made Simple was filmed with the same cast and released in 2005. At the end of its run, the series became one of the highest rated of 2005, with Wars of in Laws, which also starred Bosco Wong.

Kong has been nominated for TVB's "Most Improved Actress" award consecutively. In 2004, she entered through Aqua Heroes and Square Pegs. Later in 2005, she made it to the top 10 list with both her character as Angel in Life Made Simple and as Ha Hiu Ching in The Last Breakthrough. Bar Benders was Kong's only series broadcast in 2006 but turned up on TVB's list of top five series of that year.

In 2007, two of her series — Ten Brothers and Family Link — have also made it into TVB's five top-rated dramas of 2007. Kong also came out of War and Destiny, which was received with praise and critical acclaim for her performance. She was invited by CCTV to film The Last Princess with Sammul Chan. The show was received very well in mainland China. In December, she released her first Mandarin music album named Singing with the Moon in Beijing.

The following year, in 2008, she filmed The Greatness of a Hero in TVB, starring as Shangguan Wan'er, a well-known historic figure. The drama also starred Sunny Chan, Kent Cheng, Bernice Liu and Sonija Kwok. She once again collaborated with Kenneth Ma in a new ancient drama, Man in Charge, alongside Kate Tsui. On the second time, she filmed L For Love♥ L For Lies with Stephy Tang and Alex Fong.

Personal life
Kong married Desmond Tang in 2010.  The couple met during a collaboration of the stage play, Popcorn Killer (爆谷殺人狂), and dated for three years.  Kong uploaded a photo of herself and Tang on Weibo on 10 September 2010 to announce their engagement, with the comment "To all my good friends, thank you all for being by my side to witness my growth. I want to tell everyone now that I am preparing to step into another phase in my life! I am announcing to everyone, I am getting married!"  The couple announced that they would not hold a wedding banquet, but would celebrate with a meal with family on both sides. In March 2011, she gave birth to a baby boy, Chun Chun. In January 2015, Kong announced the birth of her second child, a baby girl delivered via caesarian section. However, in 2017, they divorced.

Kong is an advocate for animal welfare and environmental conservation. In order to properly reflect her position, she converted to a vegetarian diet in 2013.

Filmography

Television

Films

The following is the filmography (films) for Leila Tong.

Discography

References

External links
 Leila Tong on Sina Weibo
 
 Leila Tong at the Hong Kong Cinemagic

1981 births
Living people
TVB veteran actors
Hong Kong film actresses
Hong Kong child actresses
21st-century Hong Kong women singers
Cantopop singers
Indonesian people of Chinese descent
Indonesian Cantonese people
20th-century Hong Kong actresses
21st-century Hong Kong actresses
Hong Kong television actresses